The following radio stations broadcast on FM frequency 91.7 MHz:

Argentina

 CNN Radio Mendoza in Mendoza
 del parque in San Miguel de Tucumán, Tucumán
 Dipxero in Salta
 Espacio in Berazategui, Buenos Aires
 Estación sur in La Plata, Buenos Aires
 Estilo FM in Villa Gobernador Gálvez, Santa Fe
 Fiesta in Jujuy
 Horizonte in Rosario, Santa Fe
 KLA in Mar del Plata, Buenos Aires
 La Maja in Adrogué, Buenos Aires
 La primera in San Genaro, Santa Fe
 Logica in San Nicolás de los Arroyos, Buenos Aires
 LRL306 Urquiza in Buenos Aires
 LRP761 in Moisés Ville, Santa Fe
 La Uni in Los Polvorines, Buenos Aires
 Mega in Neuquén
 Naineck in Laguna Naineck, Formosa
 Nuestra in Luján, Buenos Aires
 Radio María in Coronel Suárez, Buenos Aires
 Radio María in Miramar, Buenos Aires
 Radio María in Puerto Madryn, Chubut
 Radio María in Esquel, Chubut
 Radio María in La Para, Córdoba
 Radio María in Obispo Trejo, Córdoba
 Radio María in Oliva, Córdoba
 Radio María in Paso de los libres, Corrientes
 Radio María in Pirané, Formosa
 Radio María in Puerto San Julián, Santa Cruz
 Radio María in Cipolletti, Río Negro
 Radio María in Tartagal, Salta
 Raices in Viedma, Río Negro
 Santa Cecilia in Ullum, San Juan
 Sport in Villa María, Córdoba
 RSO in Marcos Paz, Buenos Aires

Australia
 4ABCRR in Gold Coast, Queensland
 7NT in Launceston, Tasmania
 3PNN in Hamilton, Victoria
6MM in Mandurah, Western Australia

Canada (Channel 219)

 CBAF-FM-21 in Bon Accord, New Brunswick
 CBBC-FM in Lethbridge, Alberta
 CBK-FM-3 in Yorkton, Saskatchewan
 CBKP-FM in Southend, Saskatchewan
 CBMB-FM in Sherbrooke, Quebec
 CBN-FM-5 in Marystown, Newfoundland and Labrador
 CBSI-FM-19 in Old Fort Bay, Quebec
 CBUJ-FM in Winlaw, British Columbia
 CBYC-FM in Canal Flats, British Columbia
 CBYF-FM in Chilliwack, British Columbia
 CFWE-FM-1 in Joussard, Alberta
 CHBN-FM in Edmonton, Alberta
 CHES-FM in Erin, Ontario
 CIBU-FM-1 in Bluewater, Ontario
 CICS-FM in Sudbury, Ontario
 CITT-FM in Saskatoon, Saskatchewan
 CIXL-FM in Welland, Ontario
 CKAY-FM in Gibsons, British Columbia
 VF2298 in Black Lake Reserve, Saskatchewan
 VF7121 in Petawawa, Ontario
 VF7146 in Alma, Quebec
 VOAR-3-FM in Lewisporte, Newfoundland and Labrador

China 
 CNR China Traffic Radio in Lanzhou and Urumqi
 CRI News Radio in Chongqing

Greece
RSO 91.7 in Thessaloniki

Indonesia
 Serumpun Radio in Batam and Singapore

Japan
 Aomori Broadcasting Corporation
 Nankai Broadcasting

Malaysia
 Nasional FM in Kuala Terengganu, Terengganu and Negeri Sembilan
 Suria in Taiping, Perak

Mexico

 XHACT-FM in Actopan, Hidalgo
 XHBU-FM in Chihuahua, Chihuahua
 XHCIA-FM in Colima, Colima
 XHECU-FM in Los Mochis, Sinaloa
 XHEOQ-FM in Río Bravo, Tamaulipas
 XHESR-FM in Santa Rosalía, Baja California Sur
 XHGEM-FM in Toluca, Estado de México
 XHGLX-FM in Tijuana, Baja California
 XHIY-FM in Ríoverde, San Luis Potosí
 XHKH-FM in Querétaro, Querétaro
 XHMEC-FM in Amecameca, Estado de México
 XHOZ-FM in Xalapa, Veracruz
 XHPAS-FM in Mulegé, Baja California Sur
 XHPAV-FM in Pueblo Viejo, Veracruz
 XHPEAD-FM in Piedras Negras, Coahuila
 XHPHBP-FM in Huauchinango-Beristáin, Puebla
 XHPLH-FM in Pluma Hidalgo, Oaxaca
 XHQL-FM in Zamora, Michoacán
 XHRC-FM in Puebla, Puebla
 XHTEKA-FM in Juchitán, Oaxaca
 XHVA-FM in Villahermosa, Tabasco
 XHXL-FM in Monterrey, Nuevo León

The Netherlands
90FM in Leersum

New Zealand
 The Edge (radio station) in Wellington

United States (Channel 219)

 KALW in San Francisco, California
  in Alexandria, Louisiana
 KARG in Poteau, Oklahoma
 KAXE in Grand Rapids, Minnesota
  in Des Arc, Arkansas
  in Kennewick, Washington
  in Corpus Christi, Texas
  in Mccall, Idaho
  in Twin Falls, Idaho
 KCCS in Starkville, Colorado
 KCHO (FM) in Chico, California
  in Point Lookout, Missouri
 KCVO-FM in Camdenton, Missouri
 KCVS in Salina, Kansas
  in Salem, Missouri
 KDOV in Medford, Oregon
  in Douglas, Wyoming
 KEJA in Cale, Arkansas
 KEMC in Billings, Montana
 KEYR in Richfield, Utah
 KEYV in Vernal, Utah
  in Wasco, California
 KGCN (FM) in Roswell, New Mexico
  in Gallup, New Mexico
 KHBW in Brownwood, Texas
  in Palm Desert, California
 KHVU in Houston, Texas
 KIBH-FM in Seward, Alaska
 KICG in Perry, Iowa
 KJIR in Hannibal, Missouri
 KKEH in Ponderay, Idaho
 KKXT in Dallas, Texas
 KLAG in Alamogordo, New Mexico
 KLNR in Panaca, Nevada
  in Angola, Louisiana
 KLZR in Westcliffe, Colorado
 KMLL in Marysville, Kansas
 KMNO in Wailuku, Hawaii
 KMSL (FM) in Mansfield, Louisiana
 KMVC in Marshall, Missouri
  in Page, Arizona
  in San Ardo, California
 KNDW in Williston, North Dakota
  in Neosho, Missouri
 KNPS in Scobey, Montana
  in Worthington-Marshall, Minnesota
  in Natchitoches, Louisiana
 KOBH in Hobbs, New Mexico
 KOHS in Orem, Utah
 KOOP (FM) in Hornsby, Texas
  in Stillwater, Oklahoma
 KOTO (FM) in Telluride, Colorado
 KPBR (FM) in Poplar Bluff, Missouri
 KPCV (FM) in Portales, New Mexico
 KPCW in Park City, Utah
 KPHA in Mandan, North Dakota
 KPIT (FM) in Pittsburg, Texas
  in North Platte, Nebraska
 KPPD in Devils Lake, North Dakota
  in Flagstaff, Arizona
 KPWD in Lefors, Texas
 KQBI in Encinal, Texas
 KQOS in Albany, Texas
  in Moscow, Idaho
 KRKM in Fort Washakie, Wyoming
  in Douglas, Arizona
 KRTP in Alpine, Texas
  in San Antonio, Texas
 KSIF in Wellington, Texas
  in Ririe, Idaho
 KSSH in Shubert, Nebraska
  in Iowa City, Iowa
  in Mount Vernon, Washington
 KTDA in Dalhart, Texas
  in Fruitland, New Mexico
 KTPH (FM) in Tonopah, Nevada
  in Steamboat Springs, Colorado
  in Salt Lake City, Utah
 KUHM in Helena, Montana
 KUMW in Dillon, Montana
 KVAN-LP in Tucson, Arizona
 KVHL in Llano, Texas
 KVLD in Norfolk, Nebraska
 KVLP (FM) in Tucumcari, New Mexico
 KVRX in Austin, Texas
 KVTT in Dallas, Texas
  in Groveland, California
 KYAQ in Siletz, Oregon
 KYFQ in Tacoma, Washington
 KYOL in Chama, New Mexico
  in Hays, Kansas
 KZAZ (FM) in Bellingham, Washington
 KZSE in Rochester, Minnesota
 KZYU-FM in Wellton, Arizona
  in Tupelo, Mississippi
  in Gulfport, Mississippi
  in Madison, Florida
  in Campbellsville, Kentucky
  in Maynard, Massachusetts
  in Champaign, Illinois
  in Albion, Illinois
  in Ahoskie, North Carolina
  in Telford, Pennsylvania
 WBQF in Fryeburg, Maine
  in Sheffield, Massachusetts
 WCCV (FM) in Cartersville, Georgia
  in Alpena, Michigan
 WCOZ in New Albany, Pennsylvania
 WCUC-FM in Clarion, Pennsylvania
  in West Chester, Pennsylvania
  in De Graff, Ohio
  in Fond du Lac, Wisconsin
 WDOZ in Pierson, Florida
  in Pendleton, Indiana
 WEGQ in Quogue, New York
  in Milton, Florida
  in Harrisonburg, Virginia
 WEQP in Rustburg, Virginia
  in South Bend, Indiana
  in Murfreesboro, Tennessee
  in Panama City, Florida
  in Hardwick, Vermont
  in Woodstock, Vermont
  in Cookeville, Tennessee
  in Storrs, Connecticut
  in Ithaca, New York
  in Kokomo, Indiana
  in Millersville, Pennsylvania
  in Summerdale, Pennsylvania
 WJFH in Sebring, Florida
  in Zanesville, Ohio
  in Gainesville, Florida
 WJNF in Dalton, Massachusetts
 WJPR in Jasper, Indiana
 WJSI-LP in Wilmington, North Carolina
  in Owensboro, Kentucky
  in Gardner, Massachusetts
  in Philadelphia, Pennsylvania
 WKGW in Kingston, New York
 WLBS in Bristol, Pennsylvania
  in Pomona, New Jersey
 WLNJ in Lakehurst, New Jersey
  in Augusta, Georgia
  in Florence, South Carolina
 WMCN (FM) in Saint Paul, Minnesota
  in Muskegon, Michigan
  in Marco, Florida
  in Wilmington, Delaware
 WMSE in Milwaukee, Wisconsin
  in Allentown, Pennsylvania
 WMVW in Peachtree City, Georgia
  in Salem, Massachusetts
 WNEC-FM in Henniker, New Hampshire
  in Newburyport, Massachusetts
 WNFC in Paducah, Kentucky
  in Washington, Pennsylvania
 WNLJ in Madisonville, Kentucky
  in San German, Puerto Rico
 WNNZ-FM in Deerfield, Massachusetts
  in Middletown, New York
 WOSV in Mansfield, Ohio
  in Plymouth, New Hampshire
 WPIL in Heflin, Alabama
 WPRL in Lorman, Mississippi
 WQQA in Forestville, Wisconsin
 WRAO in Wisconsin Rapids, Wisconsin
 WRLC (FM) in Williamsport, Pennsylvania
 WRNM in Ellsworth, Maine
 WRTX in Dover, Delaware
  in Watertown, New York
 WRVX in Cameron, Missouri
  in Dallas, North Carolina
  in Eastport, Maine
 WSHS (FM) in Sheboygan, Wisconsin
  in Oneonta, New York
  in Forest, Mississippi
  in Madison, Wisconsin
  in Whitewater, Wisconsin
 WTJB in Columbus, Georgia
 WTRJ-FM in Orange Park, Florida
 WTYN (FM) in Lunenburg, Massachusetts
 WUGA in Athens, Georgia
 WUMG in Stow, Massachusetts
 WUMT in Marshfield, Massachusetts
 WUNV in Albany, Georgia
 WUOM in Ann Arbor, Michigan
 WVBY in Beckley, West Virginia
  in Port Charlotte, Florida
 WVMU in Ashtabula, Ohio
  in Scranton, Pennsylvania
  in Vandalia, Illinois
  in Itta Bena, Mississippi
 WVXU in Cincinnati, Ohio
 WWET in Valdosta, Georgia
  in Stuart, Florida
  in Bowling Green, Kentucky
 WWJD in Pippa Passes, Kentucky
 WWJJ in Jasper, Florida
 WWPC in New Durham, New Hampshire
  in Morgantown, West Virginia
  in Danbury, Connecticut
 WXLB in Boonville, New York
 WXLL in Lake Placid, New York
 WXPR in Rhinelander, Wisconsin
  in Decatur, Alabama
  in Youngstown, Ohio
 WYXR in Memphis, Tennessee
 WZCA in Quebradillas, Puerto Rico
 WZJR in Portland, Indiana
 WZKL in Woodstock, Illinois
 WZWG in West Grove, Pennsylvania
 WZXH in Hagerstown, Maryland

References

Lists of radio stations by frequency